Bintang Timur Atambua or Bintang Timur Atambua Football Club is a Indonesian football team based in Bintang Timur Atambua Field, Atambua, Belu Regency, East Nusa Tenggara. They currently competes in the Liga 3.

Players

Current squad

References

External links

Belu Regency
Football clubs in East Nusa Tenggara
Association football clubs established in 2015
2015 establishments in Indonesia